Alessandro Verri (9 November 1741 – 23 September 1816) was an Italian author.

Later he collaborated in the magazine Il Caffè. In this period he wrote the Saggio sulla Storia d'Italia ("Essay on Italian History", 1761–1766).

Background
Subsequently Verri moved to Rome where his main attention moved to theatre. He was one of the first Italian translators of Shakespeare. He wrote two tragedies: Pantea and La congiura di Milano ("The Conspiracy of Milan"), both published in 1779.

In 1782 he wrote the novel Le avventure di Saffo poetessa di Mitilene ("The adventures of Sappho, poet of Mitilene"), but his most famous work is the Notti romane al sepolcro degli Scipioni ("Roman Nights at the Sepulchre of the Scipios"), published in two parts in 1792 and 1804, in which the ghosts of illustrious men of the past (Cicero, Caesar and others) evoke the ancient Roman civilizations, stressing its violent background in contrast with the peaceful Christian civilization. A third part remained unpublished until 1967.

His other works include a translation of Daphnis and Chloe (1812), the novel La vita di Erostrato ("Life of Herostratus", 1815) and Vicende memorabili de' suoi tempi dal 1789 al 1801 ("Memorable happenings of His Times from 1789 to 1801", 1858). Also notable is his correspondence with his brother Pietro.

Verri died in Rome in 1816.

The younger brother of Alessandro Verri and Pietro Verri, Giovanni Verri, is supposed to be the natural father of the noted Italian novelist and poet Alessandro Manzoni. Their other brother, Carlo, was also a politician.

Further reading
 Alessandro Verri, Le avventure di Saffo poetessa di Mitilene, Roma e Genova, Stamperia Frugoni, 1809.
 testi online di Alessandro Verri a cura di Giovanni Antonio Maggi, Opere scelte di Alessandro Verri, Milano, 1822.
 opera postuma di Alessandro Verri a cura di Giovanni Antonio Maggi, Vicende memorabili dal 1789 al 1801, Milano, Tipografia Guglielmini, 1858.
 testo online di Alessandro Verri a cura di Renzo Negri, Le Notti Romane, Bari, Laterza, 1967.
  Scheda online a cura Gianni Francioni, Sergio Romagnoli, « Il Caffè » dal 1764 al 1766,  Collana «Pantheon», Bollati Boringhieri Editore, 2005 Due volumi,
 F. Novati, A. Giulini, E. Greppi, G. Seregni, Carteggio di Pietro e di Alessandro Verri, 12 volumi, Milano, L. F. Cogliati, Milesi & figli, Giuffrè, 1910–1942.
 Gianmarco Gasparri (a cura) Viaggio a Parigi e Londra (1766–1767) – Carteggio di Pietro ed Alessandro Verri, Milano, Adelphi, 1980.
 Nicola Raponi, Alessandro Verri e il Trattato di Tolentino, in Quaderni del Bicentenario 2, Tolentino, 1997, pp. 125–132
 Isabella Colucci, Antonio Canova, la marchesa Boccapaduli e Alessandro Verri:lettere a altre testimonianze inedite, in Paragone Arte, 49/1998 (1999), pp. 64–74
 Fabio Tarzia, Libri e rivoluzioni. Figure e mentalità nella Roma di fine ancien régime, Milano, Franco Angeli, 2000.   scheda online capitoli online
 Marina Pieretti, Margherita Sparapani Gentili Boccapaduli. Ritratto di una gentildonna romana (1735–1820), in “Rivista storica del Lazio”, XIII-XIV, Roma, 2001. scheda online
 Isabella Colucci, Il salotto e le collezioni della Marchesa Boccapaduli,  Quaderni storici, N. 2, agosto 2004, pp. 449–494  scheda online
 Vittoria Orlandi Balzari, Alessandro Verri antiquario in Roma,  Quaderni storici, N. 2, agosto 2004, pp. 495–528  scheda online
 Nicola Raponi, Il mito di Bonaparte in Italia. Atteggiamenti della società milanese e reazioni nello stato romano, Studi Storici Carocci, 2005, 
 Nicola Raponi, Alessandro Verri a Pievefavera (1793–1795) : allarmi rivoluzionari e scoperta di un tranquillo rifugio nella provincia romana, Estr. da: Archivio storico lombardo : giornale della Società storica lombarda, Milano, Cisalpino, 2007.
 Marina Pieretti, Il Viaggio d'Italia di Margherita Sparapani Gentili Boccapaduli, in "Scritture di donne – La memoria restituita", Atti del convegno, Roma, 23–24 marzo 2004, a cura di Marina Caffiero e Manola Ida Venzo, marzo 2007,  – scheda online
 Pietro Verri, Alessandro Verri, a cura di Sara Rosini, Carteggio di Pietro e Alessandro Verri. 19 maggio 1792 – 8 luglio 1797, Edizione Nazionale di Pietro Verri, 2008,  scheda online
 Pierre Musitelli, Le Flambeau et les ombres. Alessandro Verri, des Lumières à la Restauration (1741–1816), Rome, Collection de l’École française de Rome, vol. 512, 2016.  link

References

External links
 Note biografiche e opere di Alessandro Verri
 Breve descrizione del romanzo più famoso scritto dal Verri: Notti romane
 Palazzo Gentili Del Drago, in via San Nicola in Arcione, Roma
 Villa Gentili-Dominicini, Roma

1741 births
1816 deaths
Writers from Milan
19th-century Italian historians
Italian dramatists and playwrights
Italian male dramatists and playwrights
Italian male non-fiction writers
People of the Age of Enlightenment